The Terwillegar Park Footbridge is a pedestrian bridge that crosses the North Saskatchewan River in Edmonton, Alberta, Canada. At  in length, it is the longest stressed ribbon bridge in Canada and second longest in the world after the David Kreitzer Lake Hodges Bicycle Pedestrian Bridge in Escondido, California, United States. The bridge is a first for the city and was built to connect Terwillegar Park in the southern side with Oleskiw River Valley Park on the north side of the river. It opened to the public on October 21, 2016.

Design
The surface of the bridge consists of 86 precast deck panels, each being approximately 2.64 metres long and 5.3 metres wide. The panels are held by 162 individual steel cables that are anchored on each side of the bridge. The bridge cost $24.5 million CAD.

See also
 
 
 
 List of crossings of the North Saskatchewan River

References

External links
 Terwillegar Park Footbridge page

Bridges in Edmonton
Bridges completed in 2016
Pedestrian bridges in Canada
Stressed ribbon bridges in Canada
Suspension bridges in Canada